Say Lou Lou (formerly Saint Lou Lou) are a twin sister musical duo hailing from Australia and Sweden. Anna Miranda and Elektra June Kilbey-Jansson (born 7 June 1991) are the daughters of Steve Kilbey, the lead singer of Australian alternative band The Church, and Karin Jansson, ex-girlfriend and recording partner of Kilbey (and before then a member of Swedish new wave band Pink Champagne). They grew up in both Australia and Sweden.

The duo released their first single in 2012 before forming their own record label, à Deux, in 2013. In December 2013, it was announced that Say Lou Lou had made the BBC Sound of 2014 longlist.

Over the course of 2012 to 2014, Say Lou Lou released five singles, and their debut studio album, Lucid Dreaming, was released on 23 February 2015 in Scandinavia and 6 April 2015 elsewhere. In 2018 duet released their second record, Immortelle.

Discography

Studio albums

Singles

Music videos

References

1991 births
Living people
2012 establishments in Australia
2012 establishments in Sweden
Australian musical duos
Australian synthpop groups
Columbia Records artists
Dream pop musical groups
Electronic music duos
English-language singers from Sweden
Female musical duos
Musical groups established in 2012
Swedish musical duos
Swedish synthpop groups
Twin musical duos
Australian twins
Swedish twins
Swedish women in electronic music
Australian women in electronic music
Downtown Records artists
Kitsuné artists